Time, the Comedian is an American 1925 silent drama film directed by Robert Z. Leonard that stars Mae Busch and Lew Cody. The film was a hit.

Plot
As described in a review in a film magazine, Nora (Busch) is a discontented mother leaves her husband and baby to go with Larry (Cody), a wealthy idler. The husband commits suicide and the idler leaves her. Later we find the woman a successful opera singer. Larry again appears and falls in love with the daughter Ruth (Olmstead), now grown. To save her when she refuses to listen to her advice, the mother goes to this man and feigns love. The daughter finds her and guesses the truth, and finally finds happiness with a faithful suitor.

Cast

References

External links

1925 films
Metro-Goldwyn-Mayer films
American silent feature films
American black-and-white films
1925 drama films
Silent American drama films
Films directed by Robert Z. Leonard
1920s American films